Mimoblennius lineathorax is a species of combtooth blenny found in the western Indian ocean, around Réunion.  This species grows to a length of  SL.

References

lineathorax
Fish described in 1999